Luoding, alternately romanized as Loting, is a county-level city in the northwestern part  of Guangdong province (粤北), South China. It is administered as part of the prefecture-level city of Yunfu.

History
As early as 10,000 years ago, there were ancient people inhabited within Luoding City. Famous monument is the rock carving called Long Anyan Grottoes.

Geography

Luoding borders Guangxi to the northwest.

Notable people
 Cai Tingkai( 蔡廷鍇 ), born in 1892, died in 1968, was a Chinese general.

 Cheung ka nien ( 張嘉年）： Hong Kong actor, mr cheung is the main cast of the film: suk suk 

 Tang chun kit ( 鄧俊傑）： Hong Kong male historian, his research interest is the philosophy of scholar Zhan ruo shui( 湛若水）.

Climate

See also
2009 Luoding flood

Notes

References

External links

 
County-level cities in Guangdong
Yunfu